The 19th (nineteenth) century began on 1 January 1801 (MDCCCI), and ended on 31 December 1900 (MCM). The 19th century was the ninth century of the 2nd millennium.

The 19th century was characterized by vast social upheaval. Slavery was abolished in much of Europe and the Americas. The First Industrial Revolution, though it began in the late 18th century, expanding beyond its British homeland for the first time during this century, particularly remaking the economies and societies of the Low Countries, the Rhineland, Northern Italy, and the Northeastern United States. A few decades later, the Second Industrial Revolution led to ever more massive urbanization and much higher levels of productivity, profit, and prosperity, a pattern that continued into the 20th century. 

The Islamic gunpowder empires fell into decline and European imperialism brought much of South Asia, Southeast Asia, and almost all of Africa under colonial rule. It was also marked by the collapse of the large Spanish and Mughal empires. This paved the way for the growing influence of the British, French, German, Russian, Italian, and Japanese empires along with the United States. The British boasted unchallenged global dominance after 1815.

After the defeat of France in the Napoleonic Wars, the British and Russian empires expanded greatly, becoming two of the world's leading powers. Russia expanded its territory to Central Asia and the Caucasus. The Ottomans underwent a period of Westernization and reform known as the Tanzimat, vastly increasing their control over their core territories in the Middle East. However, it remained in decline and became known as the sick man of Europe, losing territory in the Balkans and North Africa.

The remaining powers in the Indian subcontinent such as the Maratha and Sikh empires have suffered a massive decline and their dissatisfaction with the British East India Company's rule led to the Indian Rebellion of 1857, marking its dissolution. India was later ruled directly by the British Crown through the establishment of the British Raj.

Britain's overseas possessions grew rapidly in the first half of the century, especially with the expansion of vast territories in Canada, Australia, South Africa, India, and in the last two decades of the century in Africa. By the end of the century, the British controlled a fifth of the world's land and one-quarter of the world's population. During the post-Napoleonic era, it enforced what became known as the Pax Britannica, which had ushered in unprecedented globalization on a massive scale.

Overview

The first electronics appeared in the 19th century, with the introduction of the electric relay in 1835, the telegraph and its Morse code protocol in 1837, the first telephone call in 1876, and the first functional light bulb in 1878.

The 19th century was an era of rapidly accelerating scientific discovery and invention, with significant developments in the fields of mathematics, physics, chemistry, biology, electricity, and metallurgy that laid the groundwork for the technological advances of the 20th century. The Industrial Revolution began in Great Britain and spread to continental Europe, North America, and Japan.  The Victorian era was notorious for the employment of young children in factories and mines, as well as strict social norms regarding modesty and gender roles. Japan embarked on a program of rapid modernization following the Meiji Restoration, before defeating China, under the Qing dynasty, in the First Sino-Japanese War. Advances in medicine and the understanding of human anatomy and disease prevention took place in the 19th century, and were partly responsible for rapidly accelerating population growth in the Western world. Europe's population doubled during the 19th century, from approximately 200 million to more than 400 million. The introduction of railroads provided the first major advancement in land transportation for centuries, changing the way people lived and obtained goods, and fuelling major urbanization movements in countries across the globe. Numerous cities worldwide surpassed populations of a million or more during this century. London became the world's largest city and capital of the British Empire.  Its population increased from 1 million in 1800 to 6.7 million a century later. The last remaining undiscovered landmasses of Earth, including vast expanses of interior Africa and Asia, were explored during this century, and with the exception of the extreme zones of the Arctic and Antarctic, accurate and detailed maps of the globe were available by the 1890s. Liberalism became the pre-eminent reform movement in Europe.

Slavery was greatly reduced around the world. Following a successful slave revolt in Haiti, Britain and France stepped up the battle against the Barbary pirates and succeeded in stopping their enslavement of Europeans. The UK's Slavery Abolition Act charged the British Royal Navy with ending the global slave trade. The first colonial empire in the century to abolish slavery was the British, who did so in 1834. America's Thirteenth Amendment following their Civil War abolished slavery there in 1865, and in Brazil slavery was abolished in 1888 (see abolitionism). Similarly, serfdom was abolished in Russia in 1861.

The 19th century was remarkable in the widespread formation of new settlement foundations which were particularly prevalent across North America and Australia, with a significant proportion of the two continents' largest cities being founded at some point in the century. Chicago in the United States and Melbourne in Australia were non-existent in the earliest decades but grew to become the 2nd largest cities in the United States and British Empire respectively by the end of the century. In the 19th century, approximately 70 million people left Europe, with most migrating to the United States.

The 19th century also saw the rapid creation, development, and codification of many sports, particularly in Britain and the United States. Association football, rugby union, baseball, and many other sports were developed during the 19th century, while the British Empire facilitated the rapid spread of sports such as cricket to many different parts of the world. Also, women's fashion was a very sensitive topic during this time, as women showing their ankles was viewed to be scandalous.

It also marks the fall of the Ottoman rule of the Balkans which led to the creation of Serbia, Bulgaria, Montenegro, and Romania as a result of the second Russo-Turkish War, which in itself followed the great Crimean War.

Eras

Industrial revolution
European imperialism
British Regency, Victorian era (UK, British Empire)
Bourbon Restoration, July Monarchy, French Second Republic, Second French Empire, French Third Republic (France)
Belle Époque (Europe)
Edo period, Meiji period (Japan)
Qing dynasty (China)
Nguyen dynasty (Vietnam)
Joseon dynasty (Korea)
Zulu Kingdom (South Africa)
Tanzimat, First Constitutional Era (Ottoman Empire)
Russian Empire
American Manifest Destiny, The Gilded Age, Wild West

Wars

Napoleonic Wars

The Napoleonic Wars were a series of major conflicts from 1803 to 1815 pitting the French Empire and its allies, led by Napoleon I, against a fluctuating array of European powers formed into various coalitions, financed and usually led by the United Kingdom. The wars stemmed from the unresolved disputes associated with the French Revolution and its resultant conflict.

In the aftermath of the French Revolution, Napoleon Bonaparte gained power in France in 1799. In 1804, he crowned himself Emperor of the French.

In 1805, the French victory over an Austrian-Russian army at the Battle of Austerlitz ended the War of the Third Coalition. As a result of the Treaty of Pressburg, the Holy Roman Empire was dissolved.

Later efforts were less successful. In the Peninsular War, France unsuccessfully attempted to establish Joseph Bonaparte as King of Spain. In 1812, the French invasion of Russia had massive French casualties, and was a turning point in the Napoleonic Wars.

In 1814, after defeat in the War of the Sixth Coalition, Napoleon abdicated and was exiled to Elba. Later that year, he escaped exile and began the Hundred Days before finally being defeated at the Battle of Waterloo and exiled to Saint Helena, an island in the South Atlantic Ocean.

After Napoleon's defeat, the Congress of Vienna was held to determine new national borders. The Concert of Europe attempted to preserve this settlement was established to preserve these borders, with limited impact.

Latin American independence

Mexico and the majority of the countries in Central America and South America obtained independence from colonial overlords during the 19th century. In 1804, Haiti gained independence from France. In Mexico, the Mexican War of Independence was a decade-long conflict that ended in Mexican independence in 1821.

Due to the Napoleonic Wars, the royal family of Portugal relocated to Brazil from 1808 to 1821, leading to Brazil having a separate monarchy from Portugal.

The Federal Republic of Central America gained independence from Spain in 1821 and from Mexico in 1823. After several rebellions, by 1841 the federation had dissolved into the independent countries of Guatemala, El Salvador, Honduras, Nicaragua, and Costa Rica.

In 1830, the post-colonial nation of Gran Colombia dissolved and the nations of Colombia (including modern-day Panama), Ecuador, and Venezuela took its place.

Revolutions of 1848

The Revolutions of 1848 were a series of political upheavals throughout Europe in 1848.  The revolutions were essentially democratic and liberal in nature, with the aim of removing the old monarchical structures and creating independent nation states.

The first revolution began in January in Sicily. Revolutions then spread across Europe after a separate revolution began in France in February. Over 50 countries were affected, but with no coordination or cooperation among their respective revolutionaries.

According to Evans and von Strandmann (2000), some of the major contributing factors were widespread dissatisfaction with political leadership, demands for more participation in government and democracy, demands for freedom of the press, other demands made by the working class, the upsurge of nationalism, and the regrouping of established government forces.

Abolition and the American Civil War

The abolitionism movement achieved success in the 19th century. The Atlantic slave trade was abolished in the United States in 1808, and by the end of the century, almost every government had banned slavery. The Slavery Abolition Act of 1833 banned slavery throughout the British Empire, and the Lei Áurea abolished slavery in Brazil in 1888.

Abolitionism in the United States continued until the end of the American Civil War. Frederick Douglass and Harriet Tubman were two of many American abolitionists who helped win the fight against slavery. Douglass was an articulate orator and incisive antislavery writer, while Tubman worked with a network of antislavery activists and safe houses known as the Underground Railroad.

The American Civil War took place from 1861 to 1865. Eleven southern states seceded from the United States, largely over concerns related to slavery. In 1863, President Abraham Lincoln issued the Emancipation Proclamation. Lincoln issued a preliminary on September 22, 1862 warning that in all states still in rebellion (Confederacy) on January 1, 1863, he would declare their slaves "then, thenceforward, and forever free." He did so. The Thirteenth Amendment to the Constitution, ratified in 1865, officially abolished slavery in the entire country.

Five days after Robert E. Lee surrendered at Appomattox Courthouse, Virginia, Lincoln was assassinated by actor and Confederate sympathiser John Wilkes Booth.

Decline of the Ottoman Empire 

In 1830, Greece became the first country to break away from the Ottoman Empire after the Greek War of Independence. In 1831, the Bosnian Uprising against Ottoman rule occurred. In 1817, the Principality of Serbia became suzerain from the Ottoman Empire, and in 1867, it passed a constitution that defined its independence from the Ottoman Empire. In 1876, Bulgarians instigated the April Uprising against Ottoman rule. Following the Russo-Turkish War, the Treaty of Berlin recognized the formal independence of the Serbia, Montenegro, and Romania. Bulgaria became autonomous.

China: Taiping Rebellion 

The Taiping Rebellion was the bloodiest conflict of the 19th century, leading to the deaths of around 20-30 million people. Its leader, Hong Xiuquan, declared himself the younger brother of Jesus Christ and developed a new Chinese religion known as the God Worshipping Society.  After proclaiming the establishment of the Taiping Heavenly Kingdom in 1851, the Taiping army conquered a large part of China, capturing Nanjing in 1853. In 1864, after the death of Hong Xiuquan, Qing forces recaptured Nanjing and ended the rebellion.

Japan: Meiji Restoration 

During the Edo period, Japan largely pursued an isolationist foreign policy. In 1853, United States Navy Commodore Matthew C. Perry threatened the Japanese capital Edo with gunships, demanding that they agree to open trade. This led to the opening of trade relations between Japan and foreign countries, with the policy of Sakoku formally ended in 1854.

By 1872, the Japanese government under Emperor Meiji had eliminated the daimyō system and established a strong central government. Further reforms included the abolishment of the samurai class, rapid industrialization and modernization of government, closely following European models.

Colonialism 

 1803: United States more than doubles in size when it buys out France's territorial claims in North America via the Louisiana Purchase. This begins the U.S.'s westward expansion to the Pacific, referred to as its Manifest Destiny, which involves annexing and conquering land from Mexico, Britain, and Native Americans.
 1817  – 1819: British Empire annexed the Maratha Confederacy after the Third Anglo-Maratha War.
 1823 – 1887: British Empire annexed Burma (now also called Myanmar) after three Anglo-Burmese Wars.
 1848 – 1849: Sikh Empire is defeated in the Second Anglo-Sikh War. Therefore, the entire Indian subcontinent is under British control. 
 1862: France gained its first foothold in Southeast Asia and in 1863 annexed Cambodia.
 1867: United States purchased Alaska from Russia.

Africa 

In Africa, European exploration and technology led to the colonization of almost the entire continent by 1898. New medicines such as quinine and more advanced firearms allowed European nations to conquer native populations.

Motivations for the Scramble for Africa included national pride, desire for raw materials, and Christian missionary activity. Britain seized control of Egypt to ensure control of the Suez Canal, but Ethiopia defeated Italy in the First Italo–Ethiopian War at the Battle of Adwa. France, Belgium, Portugal, and Germany also had substantial colonies. The Berlin Conference of 1884–1885 attempted to reach agreement on colonial borders in Africa, but disputes continued, both amongst European powers and in resistance by the native populations.

In 1867, diamonds were discovered in the Kimberley region of South Africa. In 1886, gold was discovered in Transvaal. This led to colonization in Southern Africa by the British and business interests, led by Cecil Rhodes.

Other wars 
 1801–1815: First Barbary War and the Second Barbary War between the United States and the Barbary States of North Africa.
 1802: Tay Son army recaptured Phu Xuan, causing Vo Tanh to commit suicide, Nguyen Phuc Anh successfully captured Thang Long, founded the Nguyen dynasty
 1804–1810: Fulani Jihad in Nigeria.
 1804–1813: Russo-Persian War.
 1806–1812: Russo-Turkish War, Treaty of Bucharest.
 1807–1837: Musket Wars among Māori in many parts of New Zealand. 
 1808–1809: Russia conquers Finland from Sweden in the Finnish War.
 1810: Grito de Dolores begins the Mexican War of Independence.
 1811: Battle of Tippecanoe: U.S outnumbering Native Americans resulting in defeat and burning of community
 1812–1815: War of 1812 between the United States and Britain; ends in a draw, except that Native Americans lose power.
 1813–1837: Afghan–Sikh Wars.
 1814–1816: Anglo-Nepalese War between Nepal (Gurkha Empire) and British Empire.
 1817: First Seminole War begins in Florida.
 1817: Russia commences its conquest of the Caucasus.
 1820: Revolutions of 1820 in Southern Europe
 1821–1830: Greek War of Independence against the Ottoman Empire. 
 1825–1830: Java War begins.
 1826–1828: After the final Russo-Persian War, the Persian Empire took back territory lost to Russia from the previous war.
 1828–1832: Black War in Tasmania leads to the near extinction of the Tasmanian aborigines
 1830: July Revolution overthrew old line of Bourbons.
 1830: November Uprising in Poland against Russia.
 1830: Belgian Revolution results in Belgium's independence from Netherlands.
 1830: End of the Java War. The whole area of Yogyakarta and Surakarta Manca nagara Dutch seized. 27 September, Klaten Agreement determines a fixed boundary between Surakarta and Yogyakarta and permanently divide the kingdom of Mataram was signed by Sasradiningrat, Pepatih Dalem Surakarta, and Danurejo, Pepatih Dalem Yogyakarta. Mataram is a de facto and de yure controlled by the Dutch East Indies.
 1831: France invades and occupies Algeria.
 1831–1833: Egyptian–Ottoman War.
 1832–1875: Regimental rebellions of Brazil
 1835–1836: Texas Revolution results in Texas's independence from Mexico.
 1839–1842: First Opium War begins.
 1846–1848: Mexican–American War leads to Mexico's cession of much of the modern-day Southwestern United States.
 1848: February Revolution overthrew Louis Philippe's government. Second Republic proclaimed; Louis Napoleon, nephew of Napoleon I, elected president.
 1853–1856: Crimean War between France, the United Kingdom, the Ottoman Empire and Russia.
 1857: Indian Rebellion against the Company Raj. After this the power of the East India Company is transferred to the British Crown.
 1859: Franco-Austrian War is part of the wars of Italian unification.
 1861–1865: American Civil War between the Union and seceding Confederacy. 
 1861–1867: French intervention in Mexico and the creation of the Second Mexican Empire, ruled by Maximilian I of Mexico and his consort Carlota of Mexico.
 1863–1865: January Uprising against the Russian Empire.
 1864–1870: Paraguayan War ends Paraguayan ambitions for expansion and destroys much of the Paraguayan population.
 1866: Austro-Prussian War results in the dissolution of the German Confederation and the creation of the North German Confederation and the Austrian-Hungarian Dual Monarchy.
 1868-1869: Boshin War results in end of the shogunate and the founding the Japanese Empire.
 1868–1878: Ten Years' War between Cuba and Spain.
 1870–1871: Franco-Prussian War results in the unifications of Germany and Italy, the collapse of the Second French Empire and the emergence of a New Imperialism.
 1870: Napoleon III abdicated after unsuccessful conclusion of Franco-Prussian War. Third Republic proclaimed.
 1876: The April Uprising in Bulgaria against the Ottoman Empire.
 1879: Anglo-Zulu War results in British victory and the annexation of the Zulu Kingdom.
 1879–1880: Little War against Spanish rule in Cuba leads to rebel defeat.
 1879–1883: Chile battles with Peru and Bolivia over Andean territory in the War of the Pacific.
 1880–1881: First Boer War begins.
 1881–1899: Mahdist War in Sudan.
 1882: Anglo-Egyptian War British invasion and subsequent occupation of Egypt
 1883–1898: Mandingo Wars between the French colonial empire and the Wassoulou Empire of the Mandingo people led by Samory Touré.
 1894–1895: After the First Sino-Japanese War, China cedes Taiwan to Japan and grants Japan a free hand in Korea.
 1895: Taiwan is ceded to the Empire of Japan as a result of the First Sino-Japanese War.
 1895–1896: Ethiopia defeats Italy in the First Italo–Ethiopian War at the Battle of Adwa.
 1895–1898: Cuban War for Independence results in Cuban independence from Spain.
 1896-1898: Philippine Revolution results in a Filipino victory.
 1898: Spanish–American War results in the independence of Cuba.
 1899–1901: Boxer Rebellion in China is suppressed by the Eight-Nation Alliance. 
 1899–1902: Thousand Days' War in Colombia breaks out between the "Liberales" and "Conservadores", culminating with the loss of Panama in 1903.
 1899–1902: Second Boer War begins.
 1899–1902: Philippine–American War begins.

Science and technology

The 19th century saw the birth of science as a profession; the term scientist was coined in 1833 by William Whewell, which soon replaced the older term of natural philosopher. Among the most influential ideas of the 19th century were those of Charles Darwin (alongside the independent researches of Alfred Russel Wallace), who in 1859 published the book The Origin of Species, which introduced the idea of evolution by natural selection. Another important landmark in medicine and biology were the successful efforts to prove the germ theory of disease. Following this, Louis Pasteur made the first vaccine against rabies, and also made many discoveries in the field of chemistry, including the asymmetry of crystals. In chemistry, Dmitri Mendeleev, following the atomic theory of John Dalton, created the first periodic table of elements. In physics, the experiments, theories and discoveries of Michael Faraday, André-Marie Ampère, James Clerk Maxwell, and their contemporaries led to the creation of electromagnetism as a new branch of science. Thermodynamics led to an understanding of heat and the notion of energy was defined. Other highlights include the discoveries unveiling the nature of atomic structure and matter, simultaneously with chemistry – and of new kinds of radiation. In astronomy, the planet Neptune was discovered. In mathematics, the notion of complex numbers finally matured and led to a subsequent analytical theory; they also began the use of hypercomplex numbers. Karl Weierstrass and others carried out the arithmetization of analysis for functions of real and complex variables. It also saw rise to new progress in geometry beyond those classical theories of Euclid, after a period of nearly two thousand years. The mathematical science of logic likewise had revolutionary breakthroughs after a similarly long period of stagnation. But the most important step in science at this time were the ideas formulated by the creators of electrical science. Their work changed the face of physics and made possible for new technology to come about including a rapid spread in the use of electric illumination and power in the last two decades of the century and radio wave communication at the end of the 1890s.

 1807: Potassium and Sodium are individually isolated by Sir Humphry Davy.
 1859: Charles Darwin publishes On the Origin of Species.
 1861: James Clerk Maxwell publishes On Physical Lines of Force, formulating the four Maxwell's equations.
 1865: Gregor Mendel formulates his laws of inheritance.
 1869: Dmitri Mendeleev creates the Periodic table.
 1873: Maxwell's A Treatise on Electricity and Magnetism published.
 1877: Asaph Hall discovers the moons of Mars
 1896: Henri Becquerel discovers radioactivity; J. J. Thomson identifies the electron, though not by name.

Medicine

 1804: Morphine first isolated.
 1842: Anesthesia used for the first time.
 1847: Chloroform invented for the first time, given to Queen Victoria at the birth of her eighth child, Prince Leopold in 1853
 1855: Cocaine is isolated by Friedrich Gaedcke.
 1885: Louis Pasteur creates the first successful vaccine against rabies for a young boy who had been bitten 14 times by a rabid dog.
 1889: Aspirin patented.

Inventions

 1804: First steam locomotive begins operation.
 1816: Laufmaschine invented by Karl von Drais.
 1825: Erie Canal opened connecting the Great Lakes to the Atlantic Ocean.
 1825: First isolation of aluminium.
 1825: The Stockton and Darlington Railway, the first public railway in the world, is opened.
 1826: Samuel Morey patents the internal combustion engine.
 1829: First electric motor built.
 1837: Telegraphy patented.
 1841: The word "dinosaur" is coined by Richard Owen.
 1844: First publicly funded telegraph line in the world—between Baltimore and Washington—sends demonstration message on 24 May, ushering in the age of the telegraph. This message read "What hath God wrought?" (Bible, Numbers 23:23)
 1849: The safety pin and the gas mask are invented.
 1852: The first successful blimp is invented
 1855: Bessemer process enables steel to be mass-produced.
 1856: World's first oil refinery in Romania
 1858: Invention of the phonautograph, the first true device for recording sound.
 1859: The first ironclad was launched into sea by the French Navy.
 1860: Benjamin Tyler Henry invents the 16 - shot Henry Rifle
 1861: Richard Gatling invents the Gatling Gun, first modern machine gun used notably in the battles of Cold Harbor and Petersburg
 1863: First section of the London Underground opens.
 1866: Successful transatlantic telegraph cable follows an earlier attempt in 1858.
 1867: Alfred Nobel invents dynamite.
 1868: Safety bicycle invented.
 1869: First transcontinental railroad completed in United States on 10 May.
 1870: Rasmus Malling-Hansen's invention the Hansen Writing Ball becomes the first commercially sold typewriter.
 1873: Blue jeans and barbed wire are invented.
 1877: Thomas Edison invents the phonograph
 1878: First commercial telephone exchange in New Haven, Connecticut.
 c. 1875/1880: Introduction of the widespread use of electric lighting. These included early crude systems in France and the UK and the introduction of large scale outdoor arc lighting systems by 1880.
 1879: Thomas Edison patents a practical incandescent light bulb.
 1882: Introduction of large scale electric power utilities with the Edison Holborn Viaduct (London) and Pearl Street (New York) power stations supplying indoor electric lighting using Edison's incandescent bulb.
 1884: Sir Hiram Maxim invents the first self-powered Machine gun.
 1885: Singer begins production of the 'Vibrating Shuttle'. which would become the most popular model of sewing machine.
 1886: Karl Benz sells the first commercial automobile.
 1890: The cardboard box is invented.
 1892: John Froelich develops and constructs the first gasoline/petrol-powered tractor.
 1894: Karl Elsener invents the Swiss Army knife.
 1894: First gramophone record.
 1895: Wilhelm Röntgen identifies x-rays.

Religion

 1818: The first permanent Reform Judaism congregation, the Neuer Israelitischer Tempel, is founded in Hamburg on October 18. Around the same time, through the development of Wissenschaft des Judentums, the seeds of Conservative Judaism are sown.
 1830: The Church of Jesus Christ of Latter Day Saints is established.
 1844: The Báb announces his revelation on 23 May, founding Bábism. He announced to the world of the coming of "He whom God shall make manifest". He is considered the forerunner of Bahá'u'lláh, the founder of the Baháʼí Faith.
 1850s–1890s: In Islam, Salafism grows in popularity.
 1851: Hong Xiuquan, the leader of the God Worshipping Society, founds the Taiping Heavenly Kingdom.
 1857: In Paris, France, Allan Kardec, publishes The Spirits' Book and founds the Spiritism.
 1868: In Japan, State Shinto is established amidst the Meiji Restoration.
 1869–1870: The First Vatican Council is convened, articulating the dogma of papal infallibility and promoting a revival of scholastic theology.
 1871–1878: In Germany, Otto von Bismarck challenges the Catholic Church in the Kulturkampf ("Culture War")
 1875: Helena Blavatsky co-founds the Theosophical Society and becomes the leading articulator of Theosophy.
 1879: Mary Baker Eddy founds the Church of Christ, Scientist. The Watchtower, published by the Jehovah's Witnesses, releases its first issue.
 1881: In the Sudan, Muhammad Ahmad claims to be the Mahdi, founding the Mahdist State and declaring war on the Khedivate of Egypt.
 1889: Mirza Ghulam Ahmad establishes the Ahmadiyya Muslim Community.
 1891: Pope Leo XIII issues the papal encyclical Rerum novarum, the first major document informing modern Catholic social teaching.

Culture

 1808: Beethoven composes Fifth Symphony
 1813: Jane Austen publishes Pride and Prejudice
 1818: Mary Shelley publishes Frankenstein.
 1819: John Keats writes his six of his best-known odes.
 1819: Théodore Géricault paints his masterpiece The Raft of the Medusa, and exhibits it in the French Salon of 1819 at the Louvre.
 1824: Premiere of Beethoven's Ninth Symphony.
 1829: Johann Wolfgang von Goethe's Faust premieres.
 1833–1834: Thomas Carlyle publishes Sartor Resartus.
 1837: Charles Dickens publishes Oliver Twist.
 1841: Ralph Waldo Emerson publishes Self-Reliance.
 1845: Frederick Douglass publishes Narrative of the Life of Frederick Douglass, an American Slave.
 1847: The Brontë sisters publish Jane Eyre, Wuthering Heights and Agnes Grey.
 1848: Karl Marx and Friedrich Engels publish The Communist Manifesto.
 1849: Josiah Henson publishes The Life of Josiah Henson, Formerly a Slave, Now an Inhabitant of Canada, as Narrated by Himself.
 1851: Herman Melville publishes Moby-Dick.
 1851: Sojourner Truth delivers the speech Ain't I a Woman?.
 1852: Harriet Beecher Stowe publishes Uncle Tom's Cabin.
 1855: Walt Whitman publishes the first edition of Leaves of Grass.
 1855: Frederick Douglass publishes the first edition of My Bondage and My Freedom.
 1862: Victor Hugo publishes Les Misérables.
 1863: Jules Verne begins publishing his collection of stories and novels, Voyages extraordinaires, with the novel Cinq semaines en ballon.
 1865: Lewis Carroll publishes Alice's Adventures in Wonderland.
 1869: Leo Tolstoy publishes War and Peace.
 1875: Georges Bizet's opera Carmen premiers in Paris.
 1876: Richard Wagner's Ring Cycle is first performed in its entirety.
 1883: Robert Louis Stevenson's Treasure Island is published.
 1884: Mark Twain publishes the Adventures of Huckleberry Finn.
 1886: "Strange Case of Dr Jekyll and Mr Hyde" by Robert Louis Stevenson is published.
 1887: Sir Arthur Conan Doyle publishes his first Sherlock Holmes story, A Study in Scarlet.
 1889: Vincent van Gogh paints The Starry Night.
 1889: Moulin Rouge opens in Paris.
 1892: Tchaikovsky's Nutcracker Suite premières in St Petersberg.
 1894: Rudyard Kipling's The Jungle Book is published
 1895: Trial of Oscar Wilde and premiere of his play The Importance of Being Earnest.
 1897: Bram Stoker writes Dracula.
 1900: L. Frank Baum publishes The Wonderful Wizard of Oz.

Literature

On the literary front the new century opens with romanticism, a movement that spread throughout Europe in reaction to 18th-century rationalism, and it develops more or less along the lines of the Industrial Revolution, with a design to react against the dramatic changes wrought on nature by the steam engine and the railway. William Wordsworth and Samuel Taylor Coleridge are considered the initiators of the new school in England, while in the continent the German Sturm und Drang spreads its influence as far as Italy and Spain.  French arts had been hampered by the Napoleonic Wars but subsequently developed rapidly. Modernism began.

The Goncourts and Émile Zola in France and Giovanni Verga in Italy produce some of the finest naturalist novels. Italian naturalist novels are especially important in that they give a social map of the new unified Italy to a people that until then had been scarcely aware of its ethnic and cultural diversity. There was a huge literary output during the 19th century. Some of the most famous writers included the Russians Alexander Pushkin, Nikolai Gogol, Leo Tolstoy, Anton Chekhov and Fyodor Dostoyevsky; the English Charles Dickens, John Keats, Alfred, Lord Tennyson and Jane Austen; the Scottish Sir Walter Scott, Thomas Carlyle and Arthur Conan Doyle (creator of the character Sherlock Holmes); the Irish Oscar Wilde; the Americans Edgar Allan Poe, Ralph Waldo Emerson, and Mark Twain; and the French Victor Hugo, Honoré de Balzac, Jules Verne, Alexandre Dumas and Charles Baudelaire.

Some American literary writers, poets and novelists were: Walt Whitman, Mark Twain, Harriet Ann Jacobs, Nathaniel Hawthorne, Ralph Waldo Emerson, Herman Melville, Frederick Douglass, Harriet Beecher Stowe, Joel Chandler Harris, and Emily Dickinson to name a few.

Photography

Ottomar Anschütz, chronophotographer
Mathew Brady, documented the American Civil War
Edward S. Curtis, documented the American West notably Native Americans
Louis Daguerre, inventor of daguerreotype process of photography, chemist
Thomas Eakins, pioneer motion photographer
George Eastman, inventor of roll film
Hércules Florence, pioneer inventor of photography
Auguste and Louis Lumière, pioneer film-makers, inventors
Étienne-Jules Marey, pioneer motion photographer, chronophotographer
Eadweard Muybridge, pioneer motion photographer, chronophotographer
Nadar a.k.a. Gaspard-Félix Tournachon, portrait photographer
Nicéphore Niépce, pioneer inventor of photography
Louis Le Prince, motion picture inventor and pioneer film-maker
Sergey Prokudin-Gorsky,  chemist and photographer
William Fox Talbot, inventor of the negative / positive photographic process.

Visual artists, painters, sculptors

The Realism and Romanticism of the early 19th century gave way to Impressionism and Post-Impressionism in the later half of the century, with Paris being the dominant art capital of the world. In the United States the Hudson River School was prominent. 19th-century painters included:

Ivan Aivazovsky
Léon Bakst
Albert Bierstadt
William Blake
Arnold Böcklin
Rosa Bonheur
William Burges
Mary Cassatt
Camille Claudel
Paul Cézanne
Frederic Edwin Church
Thomas Cole
Jan Matejko
John Constable
Camille Corot
Gustave Courbet
Honoré Daumier
Edgar Degas
Eugène Delacroix
Thomas Eakins
Caspar David Friedrich
Paul Gauguin
Théodore Géricault
Vincent van Gogh
William Morris
Francisco Goya
Andō Hiroshige
Hokusai
Winslow Homer
Jean-Auguste-Dominique Ingres
Isaac Levitan
Édouard Manet
Claude Monet
Gustave Moreau
Berthe Morisot
Edvard Munch
Mikhail Nesterov
Camille Pissarro
Augustus Pugin
Pierre-Auguste Renoir
Ilya Repin
Auguste Rodin
Albert Pinkham Ryder
John Singer Sargent
Valentin Serov
Georges Seurat
Ivan Shishkin
Vasily Surikov
James Tissot
Henri de Toulouse-Lautrec
Joseph Mallord William Turner
Viktor Vasnetsov
Eugène Viollet-le-Duc
Mikhail Vrubel
James Abbott McNeill Whistler
Tsukioka Yoshitoshi

Music

Sonata form matured during the Classical era to become the primary form of instrumental compositions throughout the 19th century. Much of the music from the 19th century was referred to as being in the Romantic style. Many great composers lived through this era such as Ludwig van Beethoven, Franz Liszt, Frédéric Chopin, Pyotr Ilyich Tchaikovsky and Richard Wagner. The list includes:

Mily Balakirev
Ludwig van Beethoven
Hector Berlioz
Georges Bizet
Alexander Borodin
Johannes Brahms
Anton Bruckner
Frédéric Chopin
Claude Debussy
Antonín Dvořák
Mikhail Glinka
Edvard Grieg
Scott Joplin
Alexandre Levy
Franz Liszt
Gustav Mahler
Felix Mendelssohn
Modest Mussorgsky
Jacques Offenbach
Niccolò Paganini
Nikolai Rimsky-Korsakov
Gioachino Rossini
Anton Rubinstein
Camille Saint-Saëns
Antonio Salieri
Franz Schubert
Robert Schumann
Alexander Scriabin
Arthur Sullivan
Pyotr Ilyich Tchaikovsky
Giuseppe Verdi
Richard Wagner

Sports
 1867: The Marquess of Queensberry Rules for boxing are published.
 1872: The first recognised international football match, between England and Scotland, is played.
 1877: The first test cricket match, between England and Australia, is played.
 1891: Basketball is invented by James Naismith.
 1895: Volleyball is invented.
 1896: Olympic Games revived in Athens.

Events

1801–1850
 1801: The Kingdom of Great Britain and the Kingdom of Ireland merge to form the United Kingdom.
 1802: The Wahhabis of the First Saudi State sack Karbala.
 1803: William Symington demonstrates his Charlotte Dundas, the "first practical steamboat".
 1803: The Wahhabis of the First Saudi State capture Mecca and Medina.
 1804: Austrian Empire founded by Francis I.
 1804: World population reaches 1 billion.
 1805: The Battle of Trafalgar eliminates the French and Spanish naval fleets and allows for British dominance of the seas, a major factor for the success of the British Empire later in the century.
 1805–1848: Muhammad Ali modernizes Egypt.

 1810: The University of Berlin was founded. Among its students and faculty are Hegel, Marx, and Bismarck. The German university reform proves to be so successful that its model is copied around the world (see History of European research universities).
 1814: Elisha Collier invents the Flintlock Revolver.
 1814 : February 1 Eruption of Mayon Volcano 
 1815: April, Mount Tambora in Sumbawa island erupts, becoming the largest volcanic eruption in recorded history, destroying Tambora culture, and killing at least 71,000 people, including its aftermath. The eruption created global climate anomalies known as "volcanic winter".
 1816: Year Without a Summer: Unusually cold conditions wreak havoc throughout the Northern Hemisphere, likely influenced by the 1815 explosion of Mount Tambora.
 1816–1828: Shaka's Zulu Kingdom becomes the largest in Southern Africa.
 1819: The Republic of Colombia (Gran Colombia) achieves independence after Simón Bolívar's triumph at the Battle of Boyacá.
 1819: The modern city of Singapore is established by the British East India Company.
 1820: Discovery of Antarctica.
 1820: Liberia founded by the American Colonization Society for freed American slaves.
 1820: Dissolution of the Maratha Empire.
 1821–1823: First Mexican Empire, as Mexico's first post-independent government, ruled by Emperor Agustín I of Mexico.
 1822: Pedro I of Brazil declared Brazil's independence from Portugal on 7 September. 
 1823: Monroe Doctrine declared by US President James Monroe.
 1825: The Decembrist revolt.

 1829: Sir Robert Peel founds the Metropolitan Police Service, the first modern police force.

 1830: Anglo-Russian rivalry over Afghanistan, the Great Game, commences and concludes in 1895.
 1831: November Uprising ends with crushing defeat for Poland in the Battle of Warsaw.
 1832: The British Parliament passes the Great Reform Act.
 1834–1859: Imam Shamil's rebellion in Russian-occupied Caucasus.
 1835–1836: The Texas Revolution in Mexico resulted in the short-lived Republic of Texas.
 1836: Samuel Colt popularizes the revolver and sets up a firearms company to manufacture his invention of the Colt Paterson revolver a six bullets firearm shot one by one without reloading manually.
 1837–1838: Rebellions of 1837 in Canada.
 1838: By this time, 46,000 Native Americans have been forcibly relocated in the Trail of Tears.
 1839–1860: After the First and Second Opium Wars, France, the United Kingdom, the United States and Russia gain many trade and associated concessions from China resulting in the start of the decline of the Qing dynasty.
 1839–1919: Anglo-Afghan Wars lead to stalemate and the establishment of the Durand line
 1842: Treaty of Nanking cedes Hong Kong to the British.
 1843: The first wagon train sets out from Missouri.
 1844: Rochdale Society of Equitable Pioneers establish what is considered the first cooperative in the world. 
 1845–1849: The Great Famine of Ireland leads to the Irish diaspora.
 1848: The Communist Manifesto published.
 1848: Seneca Falls Convention is the first women's rights convention in the United States and leads to the battle for women's suffrage.
 1848–1855: California Gold Rush.
 1849: Earliest recorded air raid, as Austria employs 200 balloons to deliver ordnance against Venice.
 1850: The Little Ice Age ends around this time.
 1850: Franz Hermann Schulze-Delitzsch establishes the first cooperative financial institution.

1851–1900
 1851: The Great Exhibition in London was the world's first international Expo or World Fair.
 1852: Frederick Douglass delivers his speech "The Meaning of July Fourth for the Negro" in Rochester, New York.
 1857: Sir Joseph Whitworth designs the first long-range sniper rifle.
 1857–1858: Indian Rebellion of 1857. The British Empire assumes control of India from the East India Company.
 1858: Construction of Big Ben is completed.
 1859–1869: Suez Canal is constructed.

 1860: Giuseppe Garibaldi launches the Expedition of the Thousand.
 1861: Russia abolishes serfdom.
 1862–1877: Muslim Rebellion in north-west China.
 1863: Formation of the International Red Cross is followed by the adoption of the First Geneva Convention in 1864.
 1865–1877: Reconstruction in the United States; Slavery is banned in the United States by the Thirteenth Amendment to the United States Constitution.
 1868: Michael Barrett is the last person to be publicly hanged in England.
 1869: The Suez Canal opens linking the Mediterranean to the Red Sea.

 1870: Official dismantling of the Cultivation System and beginning of a 'Liberal Policy' of deregulated exploitation of the Netherlands East Indies.
 1870–1890: Long Depression in Western Europe and North America.
 1871–1872: Famine in Persia is believed to have caused the death of 2 million.
 1871: The Paris Commune briefly rules the French capital.
 1872: Yellowstone National Park, the first national park, is created.
 1874: The Société Anonyme Coopérative des Artistes Peintres, Sculpteurs, and Graveurs, better known as the Impressionists, organize and present their first public group exhibition at the Paris studio of the photographer Nadar.
 1874: The Home Rule Movement is established in Ireland.
 1875: HMS Challenger surveys the deepest point in the Earth's oceans, the Challenger Deep
 1876: Battle of the Little Bighorn leads to the death of General Custer and victory for the alliance of Lakota, Cheyenne and Arapaho
 1876–1914: The massive expansion in population, territory, industry and wealth in the United States is referred to as the Gilded Age.
 1877: Great Railroad Strike in the United States may have been the world's first nationwide labour strike.
 1881: Wave of pogroms begins in the Russian Empire.
 1881–1882: The Jules Ferry laws are passed in France establishing free, secular education.
 1883: Krakatoa volcano explosion, one of the largest in modern history.
 1883: The quagga is rendered extinct.
 1886: Construction of the Statue of Liberty; Coca-Cola is developed.
 1888: Founding of the shipping line Koninklijke Paketvaart-Maatschappij (KPM) that supported the unification and development of the colonial economy.
 1888: The Golden Law abolishes slavery in Brazil.
 1889: Eiffel Tower is inaugurated in Paris.

 1889: A republican military coup establishes the First Brazilian Republic. The parliamentary constitutional monarchy is abolished.
 1889-1890: 1889–1890 pandemic kills 1 million people. 
 1890: First use of the electric chair as a method of execution.
 1892: The World's Columbian Exposition was held in Chicago celebrating the 400th anniversary of Christopher Columbus's arrival in the New World.
 1892: Fingerprinting is officially adopted for the first time.
 1893: New Zealand becomes the first country to enact women's suffrage.
 1893: The Coremans-de Vriendt law is passed in Belgium, creating legal equality for French and Dutch languages.
 1894: The Dutch intervention in Lombok and Karangasem resulted in the looting and destruction of Cakranegara Palace in Mataram. J. L. A. Brandes, a Dutch philologist, discovers and secures Nagarakretagama manuscript in Lombok royal library.
 1896: Philippine Revolution ends declaring Philippines free from Spanish rule.
 1898: The United States gains control of Cuba, Puerto Rico, and the Philippines after the Spanish–American War.
 1898: Empress Dowager Cixi of China engineers a coup d'état, marking the end of the Hundred Days' Reform; the Guangxu Emperor is arrested.
 1900: Exposition Universelle held in Paris, prominently featuring the growing art trend Art Nouveau.
 1900–1901: Eight nations invade China at the same time and ransack Forbidden City.

Supplementary portrait gallery

See also

Timelines of modern history
Long nineteenth century
19th century in film
19th century in games
19th-century philosophy
Nineteenth-century theatre
International relations (1814–1919)
List of wars: 1800–1899
Victorian era
France in the long nineteenth century
History of Spain (1808–1874)
History of Russia (1855–1892)
Slavery in the United States
Timeline of 19th-century Muslim history
Timeline of historic inventions

References

Further reading
 Langer, William. An Encyclopedia of World History (5th ed. 1973); highly detailed outline of events online free
 Morris, Richard B. and Graham W. Irwin, eds. Harper Encyclopedia of the Modern World: A Concise Reference History from 1760 to the Present (1970) online frr

 New Cambridge Modern History (13 vol 1957–79), old but thorough coverage, mostly of Europe; strong on diplomacy
Bury, J. P. T. ed. The New Cambridge Modern History: Vol. 10: the Zenith of European Power, 1830–70 (1964) online
Crawley, C. W., ed. The New Cambridge Modern History Volume IX War and Peace In An Age of Upheaval 1793–1830 (1965)  online
Darby, H. C.  and H. Fullard The New Cambridge Modern History, Vol. 14: Atlas (1972)
Hinsley, F.H., ed. The New Cambridge Modern History, vol. 11, Material Progress and World-Wide Problems 1870–1898 (1979) online

Diplomacy and international relations

 
 
 Bridge, F. R. & Roger Bullen. The Great Powers and the European States System 1814–1914, 2nd Ed. (2005)
 
 Herring, George C. Years of Peril and Ambition: U.S. Foreign Relations, 1776–1921 (2017)
 Kennedy, Paul. The Rise and Fall of the Great Powers Economic Change and Military Conflict From 1500–2000 (1987), stress on economic and military factors
 Langer, William.  European Alliances and Alignments 1870–1890 (1950); advanced history online
 Langer, William. The Diplomacy of Imperialism 1890–1902 (1950); advanced history online
 Mowat, R.B. A history of European diplomacy, 1815–1914 (1922) online free
 
 Porter, Andrew, ed. The Oxford History of the British Empire: Volume III: The Nineteenth Century (2001)
 Sontag, Raymond. European Diplomatic History: 1871–1932 (1933), basic summary; 425 pp online
 Taylor, A.J.P. The Struggle for Mastery in Europe 1848–1918 (1954) 638 pp; advanced history and analysis of major diplomacy; online free
 Taylor, A.J.P.  "International Relations" in F.H. Hinsley, ed., The New Cambridge Modern History: XI: Material Progress and World-Wide Problems, 1870–98 (1962): 542–66. online

Europe
 Anderson, M. S. The Ascendancy of Europe: 1815–1914 (3rd ed. 2003)
 Blanning, T. C. W. ed. The Nineteenth Century: Europe 1789–1914 (Short Oxford History of Europe) (2000) 320 pp
 Bruun, Geoffrey. Europe and the French Imperium, 1799–1814  (1938) online.
 Cameron, Rondo. France and the Economic Development of Europe, 1800–1914: Conquests of Peace and Seeds of War (1961), awide-ranging economic and business history.
 Evans, Richard J. The Pursuit of Power: Europe 1815–1914 (2016), 934 pp
 Gildea, Robert. Barricades and Borders: Europe 1800–1914 (3rd ed. 2003) 544 pp,  online 2nd ed, 1996
 
 Mason, David S. A Concise History of Modern Europe: Liberty, Equality, Solidarity (2011), since 1700
 Merriman, John, and J. M. Winter, eds. Europe 1789 to 1914: Encyclopedia of the Age of Industry and Empire (5 vol. 2006)
 Steinberg, Jonathan. Bismarck: A Life (2011)
 Salmi, Hannu. 19th Century Europe: A Cultural History (2008).

Asia, Africa
 Ajayi, J. F. Ade, ed. UNESCO General History of Africa, Vol. VI, Abridged Edition: Africa in the Nineteenth Century until the 1880s (1998) 
 
 Chamberlain. M.E. The Scramble for Africa (3rd ed. 2010)
 Collins, Robert O. and James M, Burns, eds. A History of Sub-Saharan Africa. 
Davidson, Basil Africa In History, Themes and Outlines. (2nd ed. 1991). 
 
 Ludden, David. India and South Asia: A Short History (2013).
 McEvedy, Colin. The Penguin Atlas of African History (2nd ed. 1996). excerpt
 Mansfield, Peter, and Nicolas Pelham, A History of the Middle East (4th ed, 2013).
 
 Pakenham, Thomas. The Scramble for Africa: 1876 to 1912 (1992)

North and South America 
Bakewell, Peter, A History of Latin America (Blackwell, 1997)
  Beezley, William,  and Michael Meyer, eds. The Oxford History of Mexico (2010)
 
 Black, Conrad. Rise to Greatness: The History of Canada From the Vikings to the Present (2014)
 Burns, E. Bradford, Latin America: A Concise Interpretive History, paperback, Prentice Hall 2001, 7th edition
 Howe, Daniel Walker. What Hath God Wrought: The Transformation of America, 1815–1848 (2009), Pulitzer Prize
 Kirkland, Edward C. A History Of American Economic Life (3rd ed. 1960) online
 Lynch, John, ed. Latin American revolutions, 1808–1826: old and new world origins (University of Oklahoma Press, 1994)
 McPherson, James M. Battle Cry of Freedom The CIvil War Era (1988) Pulitzer Prize for US history
 Parry, J.H.  A Short History of the West Indies (1987)
 Paxson, Frederic Logan. History of the American frontier, 1763–1893  (1924)  online, Pulitzer Prize
 White, Richard. The Republic for Which It Stands: The United States during Reconstruction and the Gilded Age, 1865–1896 (2017)

Primary sources
 de Bary,  Wm. Theodore, ed. Sources of East Asian Tradition, Vol. 2: The Modern Period (2008), 1192 pp
 Kertesz, G.A. ed Documents in the Political History of the European Continent 1815–1939 (1968), 507 pp; several hundred short documents

External links
 

 
2nd millennium
Centuries
Late modern period